was a Japanese statesman of the Asuka period and early Nara period His family name was Mononobe no Muraji, later Mononobe no Ason and Isonokami no Ason.

In 672 Maro supported Prince Ōtomo (later known as Emperor Kōbun) in the Jinshin War until the prince's suicide. He was forgiven and sent as an envoy to Silla in 676. He became centrally involved in politics with a promotion to dainagon in 701, making udaijin in 704 and sadaijin in 708. Between 715 and his death in 717 Maro was the most powerful man in the daijō-kan.

Rise to power 
Mononobe no Maro first appears in historical documents at the conclusion of the Jinshin War of 672, on the side of Prince Ōtomo. His activities in the war are not known, but Maro, along with a few other retainers, followed the Prince until his suicide.

In 676, Maro was sent to Silla as an ambassador. Japan and Silla exchanged frequent envoys at this time. Maro returned some four months later. Why Emperor Tenmu granted Maro such a position after his side's defeat is uncertain. It may be that his loyalty in serving his lord until the end won him some respect. Four months after Maro's return, Okimi died and was posthumously named the head of the family.

With the 684 reform of the kabane system, the Mononobe clan's kabane was changed from Muraji to Ason. The clan's name appears to have been changed to Isonokami around this time. At the funeral service of Emperor Tenmu, Maro spoke a condolence message as a representative of the ministry of justice.

He participated in Empress Jitō's enthronement ceremony in 690, and in 700 was put in charge of the Dazaifu.

Later that year,  died, and Maro went with Prince Osakabe to deliver a gift from the Emperor to his house. When the udaijin  died in 703, Maro was again the deliverer of gifts and condolences.

As daijin 

Prince Osakabe, and the highest-ranking official outside of the imperial family. In 705, Osakabe was replaced as chi-daijō-kanji by Prince Hozumi.

Two months later, Maro was promoted to the long-vacant position of sadaijin, and Fuhito filled his vacancy as udaijin. However, Fuhito is supposed to have been the real political power at this time.

In 710, the capital was moved to Heijō-kyō, and Maro was put in charge of the old capital. Four months later, his servant  offered to the Emperor an auspicious melon, and officials both civil and military reported to the Emperor their congratulations.

In 715, Prince Hozumi died, leaving Maro as the highest-ranking retainer. On April 22, 717, Maro died at the age of 78. Condolences were presented by representatives of the daijō-kan, nobles above the fifth rank, and nobles below the sixth rank. The Shoku Nihongi records that . Eight months later additional presents were made to him, of rough silk, thread, cotton, and cloth.

Genealogy 
Father: 
Mother: Unknown
Wife: Unknown
Son: 
Son: 
Son: 
Son: 
Son: 
Daughter: Main wife of Fujiwara no Umakai

Notes

References 

640 births
717 deaths
People of Asuka-period Japan
Japanese government officials
Mononobe clan